Scottish Women in Sport (SWiS) is a charity founded in 2013, which advocates for inclusive gender equality in sport in Scotland.

Aim 
SWiS promotes equality and parity across all aspects of sport for women and girls, including but not limited to active participation, coaching, leadership, and officiating. They do this by promoting positive role models, sharing good practice, advocating for increased investment and media coverage in women and girls' sport in Scotland.

SWiS has three broad aims:

 Educate
 Participate
 Celebrate

Launch 
The charity was launched in 2013 at the Emirates Arena in Glasgow. Speakers at the Launch event included Judy Murray, Alison Walker, Elaine C Smith, Katherine Grainger.

The founding Chief Executive Officer of SWiS is Maureen McGonigle.

Activity 
SWiS have run a number of campaigns focusing on different aspects of women's sport, including 'Girls Do Sport' which was a partnership between SWiS and University of the West of Scotland, which promoted 7 sports through a series of short 15 minute programmes made by students on media and journalism courses at the University  

The charity host an annual Awards Ceremony where trophies are given to sportswomen, coaches, teams and organisations who have excelled in the field of Scottish sport in the past 12 months. They also host an annual conference.

The charity host a regular blog on the SWiS website with posts from sportswomen and those active in women's sport in Scotland.

In 2018 it launched the Scottish Women in Sport Hall of Fame, to celebrate past and current pioneers of women and girls sport in Scotland.

Reference 

Charities based in Scotland